Lebedev is a crater on the far side of the Moon. It is located at the eastern edge of the irregular feature known as Mare Australe. The crater lies to the southeast of the larger, flooded Lamb, and to the east-northeast of Anuchin. To the southeast of Lebedev lies the smaller crater Cassegrain.

This is a worn and eroded crater formation with an uneven outer rim, although no significant impacts overlay the rim edge. There are a few small craterlets along the inner wall, with a pair along the southeast and another to the southwest. The most distinctive feature about this crater, however, is the dark, lava-flooded interior. This surface is pitted with many tiny craterlets and has a low ridge in the southern half, but is otherwise level and nearly featureless.

Satellite craters
By convention these features are identified on lunar maps by placing the letter on the side of the crater midpoint that is closest to Lebedev.

References

 
 
 
 
 
 
 
 
 
 
 
 

Impact craters on the Moon